William Down (22 January 1898 – 1977) was an English professional association footballer who played as a goalkeeper. He played over 200 matches in the Football League for four clubs during the 1920s.

Sources

References

Footballers from Sunderland
English footballers
Association football goalkeepers
Leeds United F.C. players
Doncaster Rovers F.C. players
Burnley F.C. players
Torquay United F.C. players
Wigan Borough F.C. players
English Football League players
1898 births
1977 deaths